Robert Steven Hislop (11 January 1962 – 30 July 2003) was a Scottish motorcycle racer.  Hislop won at the Isle of Man TT eleven times, won the British 250cc Championship (1990) and British Superbike championship (1995 and 2002).

Hislop died when piloting his  Robinson R44 helicopter in July 2003. He was inducted into the Scottish Sports Hall of Fame in March 2010.

Biography

Hislop was born into a close, Scottish Borders family. He grew up in the village of Chesters near the town of Hawick with his father Sandy, mother Margaret and younger brother Garry [his best friend]. Sandy encouraged his boys to be enthusiastic about competitive motorcycling and take up racing. However, when Garry was killed in a racing accident at Silloth circuit in 1982 aged 19, Hislop's enthusiasm waned and he slumped into an alcohol fuelled depression [the death of his father three years earlier from a heart attack may also have contributed].

Racing career
Hislop recovered and began his Isle of Man road racing career in 1983 by finishing second in the newcomers' race at the Manx Grand Prix, the year after Garry won it. On short circuits, his first championship success came when he won the 250cc British Championship in 1990. Superbike victory followed with the British Superbike Championship in 1995. Some attributed his success to James Whitham leaving the series mid-season to deal with cancer [Whitham was behind in the championship prior to his illness]. Although he did not take a BSB victory in 1996 or 1997, Hislop was hired by Rob McElnea's dominant Cadbury's Boost Yamaha team for 1998 [to the surprise of commentators and journalists, most notably BBC pundit Barry Nutley]. The nature of the fight for the championship between Hislop & team mate Mackenzie was illustrated by a near-collision on the last lap at Snetterton which cost the team a 1–2 finish. Hislop generally matched his countryman before an injurious crash took him out of title contention.
His last championship success came in 2002 when he won the British Superbike Championship riding a Ducati. A notable feature of his season resulted from Hislop lapping Donington Park circuit more quickly on a superbike than the fastest Moto GP machine: Hislop's modified production Ducati was heavier and less powerful than the bespoke Grand Prix bikes.

1992 Senior TT

The 1992 Senior TT is often described as one of the best races in TT history.

After their successful 1991 TT on all conquering Honda RVF machines, Hislop and Carl Fogarty had not planned to return in 1992. However, they both lined up on the Glencrutchery Road that year on unfancied machinery: Hislop was on Ron Haslam's Norton with Fogarty on the Loctite Yamaha. The Norton 588 had been developed on a shoe string budget when compared with the Japanese competition. John Player [the main Norton sponsor] had no intention of backing Hislop's TT campaign but after scratching around for some support and with minimal testing time, the team headed for the Isle of Man.

Hislop's Norton took to the circuit in the unconventional white livery of Hislop's long term sponsor Abus. Hislop and the team defied the bike's detractors by taking a fine 2nd place in the opening TT F1 race. The bike proved it could complete 6 laps of the gruelling Snaefell Mountain Course in hot weather so the team looked forward to Friday's Senior TT.

A number of adjustments had been made to the Norton prior to the Senior: a larger screen was fitted to protect Hislop from the high winds, the front mud guard was removed to admit more cooling air to the engine and protective covers were fitted to the front forks.

Hislop's main rival was Carl Fogarty who started at number 4. Hislop started at 19. Not only did this give the Scot more traffic to contend with but it also gave the crowd an anxious wait as the officials calculated the time difference between them [a gap that never exceeded 7.4 seconds]. As the race progressed, the two riders smashed records they set the previous year with Hislop taking a narrow advantage into the final lap. In a last-ditch attempt to catch Hislop, Fogarty recorded a record lap time of more than 123 mph on his Yamaha. It was all in vain however as Hislop guided the fly splattered Norton home to an historic win. This was one of Hislop's greatest achievements and one of the most popular TT wins. Carl Fogarty's lap record stood for 7 years.

Hislop and Fogarty went on to become two of Britain's most successful motorcycle racers, winning many races and championships [Hislop mainly domestically and Fogarty internationally]. It was the 1992 Senior TT that saw them battle together for the last time.

Described by some as a flawed sporting genius, success in the world championships never materialised for Hislop. This was possibly because of a self-destructive aspect to his character. The flaw may have led to a number of well-publicised clashes with other riders and teams in the British championships which hindered progress into international series.

Personal life
Having lost his brother and many friends in motorcycle accidents, Hislop made a point of never going to the funerals of fellow racers, saying: "Some people might find that a bit callous. I only ever attend family ones and people find it a bit strange that I won’t go to a friend’s funeral, but it’s just my little way of shutting off."

Hislop had two children by former partner Kelly Bailey, the first called Aaron Hislop but the couple split just before his second son Connor was born. He had joint custody of the children, and had found love again with girlfriend Ally Greenwood.

Hislop died in a helicopter accident near Teviothead, Roxburghshire and was interred in the village of Chesters near his birthplace of Hawick, Scotland.

Legacy

 Knickerbrook Chicane at the Oulton Park circuit in Cheshire was renamed "Hislops Chicane" following re-development over the 2003 winter period.
 There is a bronze statue in memory of Hislop on Onchan Head, Isle of Man
 There is a bronze statue in memory of Hizzy in Wilton park, Hawick, near his hometown of Denholm. It is unusual as it is a life-sized image of Hizzy in his leathers and is mounted at ground level.
Hislop has a museum room all about him at Wilton park. It displays trophies, some of Hislop's bikes and leathers. It also has x-rays taken after Hizzy broke his neck.
There is an Annual Hizzy Run which Starts and finishes in Denholm Green. The run was started in 2003 by fellow racer and friend Alan Duffus to raise money for the bronze statues which were put in place 2005. The Run is still going and regularly attracts hundreds of bikers who listen to speeches made by friends and fellow racers.

References

1962 births
2003 deaths
Aviators killed in aviation accidents or incidents in Scotland
British Superbike Championship riders
Isle of Man TT riders
Scottish motorcycle racers
Sportspeople from Hawick
Sportspeople from the Scottish Borders
Superbike World Championship riders
Victims of aviation accidents or incidents in 2003
Victims of helicopter accidents or incidents